Chief Metea or Me-te-a (fl. 1812–1827) (Potawatomi: Mdewé "Sulks") was one of the principal chiefs of the Potawatomi during the early 19th century. He frequently acted as spokesman at treaty councils. His village, Muskwawasepotan, was located on the St. Joseph River near the present-day town of Cedarville, Indiana.

He acted as principal Potawatomi informant to William Keating, during the 1823 expedition into the Indiana territory by Major Stephen Long.

Metea died at Fort Wayne, Indiana on May 5, 1827. His death was caused by accidental ingestion of poison, which he mistook for whiskey.

Miscellaneous
Metea, a small town in Cass County, Indiana, and Metea County Park and Nature Preserve, an Allen County, Indiana park near Leo-Cedarville along Cedar Creek, are both named after Chief Metea. Also, Metea Valley High School in Aurora, Illinois is named after Chief Metea.

External links 
Miami Indians Ethnohistory Archives
National Portrait Gallery

1827 deaths
Native American leaders
Potawatomi people
Year of birth unknown